Michael Kevin Ferguson (9 March 1943  – 27 August 2019) was an English footballer who played as a midfielder in the Football League for Accrington Stanley, Blackburn Rovers, Aston Villa, Queens Park Rangers, Cambridge United, Rochdale and Halifax Town, and in the North American Soccer League for the Los Angeles Aztecs.

Career
Ferguson was born in Burnley, Lancashire. He started with Plymouth Argyle, then as a member of the Accrington Stanley team that dropped out of the league in 1962. He scored their last goal in the league though this was officially expunged as Accrington did not complete the League season. Moves to Blackburn Rovers and Aston Villa followed before joining Queens Park Rangers in November 1969.

Ferguson made 68 appearances for QPR spanning four seasons, scoring 2 goals. He made his QPR debut in November 1969 at home to Leicester City.

Ferguson left Rangers in 1973 for Cambridge United and then Rochdale whom he unsuccessfully managed between 1977 and 1978 before moving to the United States with the Los Angeles Aztecs. He also managed ÍA Akranes from Iceland in 1976, APOEL Nicosia between 1981 and 1983 and was a part of the Kuwait national team set up along with Malcolm Allison.

References

1943 births
Living people
English footballers
Footballers from Burnley
Association football midfielders
Plymouth Argyle F.C. players
Accrington Stanley F.C. (1891) players
Blackburn Rovers F.C. players
Aston Villa F.C. players
Queens Park Rangers F.C. players
Rochdale A.F.C. players
Cambridge United F.C. players
Halifax Town A.F.C. players
English football managers
Íþróttabandalag Akraness managers
APOEL FC managers
Rochdale A.F.C. managers
Tottenham Hotspur F.C. non-playing staff 
Los Angeles Aztecs players
North American Soccer League (1968–1984) players
English expatriate footballers
English expatriate football managers
English expatriate sportspeople in the United States
Expatriate soccer players in the United States
English expatriate sportspeople in Iceland
Expatriate football managers in Iceland
English expatriate sportspeople in Cyprus
Expatriate football managers in Cyprus
English expatriate sportspeople in Kuwait